Vallhall Arena is a multi-purpose indoor arena, located in Valle-Hovin, Oslo, Norway. The stadium has a capacity of 5,500 people, during matches. The Tippeligaen club Vålerenga uses the arena for training and friendly matches in the winter off-season. 

It is currently used mostly for football matches. The arena also serves as an event arena.

The arena is also a well-known concert hall, with a capacity of 12,500 people. It's not far away from Valle Hovin, an outdoor concert arena. On 22 April 2001, Irish vocal pop band Westlife held a concert for their Where Dreams Come True Tour supporting their album Coast to Coast.

See also
 List of indoor arenas in Norway
 List of indoor arenas in Nordic countries

References

External links

 
 Vallhall Arena photos and video - Nordic Stadiums

Sports venues in Oslo
Football venues in Norway
Music venues in Oslo
Indoor arenas in Norway